Gabriela Lee (née Talabă; born 23 August 1995) is a Romanian tennis player.

She has a career-high WTA singles ranking of 136, achieved on 1 August 2022, and a career-high WTA doubles ranking of 229, also set on 1 August 2022. To date, she has won five singles and ten doubles titles on the ITF Women's Circuit.

Talabă made her WTA Tour main-draw debut at the 2020 Lexington Challenger, having received a wildcard into the doubles tournament, partnering Caitlin Whoriskey.

In September 2020, she entered the qualifying round of the French Open, her first Grand Slam tournament ever played. However, she lost her first match against Clara Tauson from Denmark.

Performance timeline

Singles
Current after the 2022 Emilia Romagna Open.

ITF Circuit finals

Singles: 8 (5 titles, 3 runner–ups)

Doubles: 18 (10 titles, 8 runner–ups)

References

External links
 Official website
 
 
 Gabriela Lee at Texas Tech University

1995 births
Living people
Romanian female tennis players
Sportspeople from Galați
Texas Tech Red Raiders women's tennis players